Germany–Italy relations are the international relations between the Federal Republic of Germany and the Italian Republic.

History

Relations were established after the Unification of Italy. The two countries historically enjoy a special relationship since they fought together against the Austrian Empire and parts of their respective territories belonged to the Holy Roman Empire and the German Confederation. Italy and Germany were both part of the Triple Alliance but they became enemies during World War I. Both countries eventually became members of the Axis powers during World War II, formed an alliance during the Cold War (West Germany), were among the inner six and became two of the G6 nations after their economic miracle.

Prime Minister Giulio Andreotti was not in favour of the German reunification but today the Italian government and the German one are full and leading members of the European Union. In 2005, a German cardinal was elected Bishop of Rome. Germany has an embassy in Rome and consulates in Milan and Naples, while Italy has an embassy in Berlin and consulates in Frankfurt, Freiburg, Hamburg, Hanover, Munich, Nuremberg, Saarbrücken, and Stuttgart.

German community in Italy

Italy - Germany Relations (1939)
Before the eruption of World War II the Italian government, led by Benito Mussolini, established The Pact of Steel between Adolf Hitler's Germany government in efforts to establish a unified military entity to combat the Allied Powers. Although both sides established a governmental agreement, Italy and Germany remained fearful and distrusted towards one another. This distrust between the two governments would often contradict their military actions of unison to being ones aimed against one another. In 1940 the original bipolar pact between Germany and Italy would be adding an existing member with Japan becoming the Tripartite Pact.

Italian Social Republic 

In 1943, members of the Italian Grand Council voted against Benito Mussolini's political power and demanded his resignation. The decline in support from Mussolini's government was viewed as being rooted in the betrayal of his closest advisers and aides. During this time Victor Emmanuel stripped the Prime Ministerial powers of Mussolini and demanded his arrest. While arrested Mussolini was forced to the island of Ponza and placed as a political prisoner. Soon after Mussolini was sent to the Mt. Gran Sasso where German soldiers made a daring attempt in rescuing him and bringing him to Adolf Hitler. During this time Hitler sought to regain Mussolini's political support back into Italy's government. Just after a short time of Mussolini's demise those that allied against and caused his fall from power were trialed and executed. In efforts to regain a hold on the Italian government Hitler sought to establish the Italian Social Republic, a puppet republic in the town of Salo, in which he encouraged Mussolini to rally political support in efforts to fight against allied forces. Being a reinstalled leader Mussolini who was once a sovereign leaders was now seen as a puppet that was in the hands of the German government.

Post war 
Both countries were founder members of the  European Coal and Steel Community, now the European Union.

During 2017, Italy's economy was valued as being the seventh largest exporting country in the world, while being ranked tenth among all imports around the world. In 2017, Italy's top importing and exporting partner was Germany at $72.2 billion in imports, while exporting $58.5 billion. At 7.1%, the largest product that Italy imports are cars, while its leading exports are Packaged Medicament's (Medicines) at 4.5%. These being Italy's largest imports, 33% are imported from Germany and 12% are from Spain. Whereas Italy's leading exports in Medicines are to Belgium, Luxembourg and Switzerland at a combined 32%, exports to Germany alone are at 9.6%.

Country comparison

See also
 Foreign relations of Germany
 Foreign relations of Italy
 Germany–Holy See relations
 Italians in Germany

References

Further reading
 Bessel, Richard, ed. Fascist Italy and Nazi Germany: comparisons and contrasts (Cambridge University Press, 1996).
 Knox, MacGregor. Common Destiny: Dictatorship, Foreign Policy, and War in Fascist Italy and Nazi Germany (Cambridge University Press, 2000).

 

 
Italy
Bilateral relations of Italy